John Jacob "Jay" Rhodes III (September 8, 1943 – January 20, 2011) was a Republican Representative from Arizona's 1st congressional district.

Youth and education
Rhodes was born in Mesa, Arizona.  His father and namesake, John Jacob Rhodes, represented the 1st district from 1953 to 1983. As a result, the younger Rhodes spent much of his youth in Washington, D. C.  He graduated from the Landon School in Bethesda, Maryland (1961); graduated from Yale University in New Haven, Connecticut (1965) with an A.B., and from the University of Arizona College of Law in Tucson, Arizona with a J.D. (1968).

Rhodes joined the United States Army in 1968, served in Vietnam, and left as a captain in 1970.  He was admitted to the Arizona State bar in 1968 and commenced practice in Mesa. Rhodes was a Republican district chairman (1972–1982), served on the Mesa Board of Education (1973–1976), and served with Central Arizona Water Conservation District (1983–1986).

While in Congress
After his father's successor, John McCain, was elected to the United States Senate, Rhodes jumped in the Republican primary for his father's seat, anchored in the East Valley.  Despite his name recognition in the district, he faced a tough contest in the four-way Republican primary—the real contest in this heavily Republican district.  While he won the nomination, it was only by 5,000 votes, and he fell far short of a majority.  Nonetheless, he romped to victory in November with 71 percent of the vote.  He was reelected almost as easily in 1988, and in 1990 no Democrat even filed to run against him.

Rhodes appeared to be a heavy favorite for a fourth term in 1992.  His district had become even more Republican on paper when redistricting shifted several majority-Hispanic neighborhoods in Phoenix to the 2nd District.  However, his Democratic challenger, Sam Coppersmith, hammered Rhodes for several ethical lapses.  In one of the biggest upsets in Arizona political history, Coppersmith defeated Rhodes by just over six points.

After his defeat, he remained in Washington, D.C.

Accident and death
Rhodes died on January 20, 2011, at the Veterans Administration Medical Center in Washington, D.C. Rhodes had been treated for three fractured vertebrae he sustained in an automobile accident in October 2010. He was found unconscious ten days before his death and began suffering organ failure. He was survived by his wife, Jane, sons John, Taylor, Jeremy, Dennis and Arthur, and mother, Betty Rhodes.

Notes

External links

 Finding Aid to the John J. Rhodes Papers at Arizona State University
 

1943 births
2011 deaths
United States Army personnel of the Vietnam War
Arizona lawyers
Burials at Arlington National Cemetery
Politicians from Mesa, Arizona
Military personnel from Arizona
University of Arizona alumni
Yale University alumni
United States Army officers
Deaths from organ failure
Republican Party members of the United States House of Representatives from Arizona
20th-century American politicians
20th-century American lawyers